Tabloid Wars is an American reality television series which premiered on July 24, 2006, on the Bravo cable network. Filmed in mid-2005, the show chronicles the working lives of journalists from the New York Daily News.

Featured writers and editors included Michael Cooke, Lenore Skenazy, Dean Chang, Tracy Connor, Tony Sclafani, Joanna Molloy, Kerry Burke, and Hudson "Hud" Morgan. Despite good reviews from critics, the show was not renewed for a second season.

The show was initially supposed to focus on employees working in the New York Post; the editor in chief Col Allan, however, opted to pass on the show. The series was announced in April 2005 and was initially called The Daily News.

References

External links
 
 

2000s American reality television series
2006 American television series debuts
2006 American television series endings
Bravo (American TV network) original programming
Television series about journalism